The 1988 U.S. Women's Hard Court Championships was a tennis tournament played on outdoor hard courts in San Antonio, Texas in the United States and was part of the Category 3 tier of the 1988 WTA Tour. The tournament ran from February 29 through March 5, 1988. The Steffi Graf won the singles title.

Finals

Singles

 Steffi Graf defeated  Katerina Maleeva 6–4, 6–1
 It was Graf's 2nd title of the year and the 27th of her career.

Doubles

 Lori McNeil /  Helena Suková defeated  Rosalyn Fairbank /  Gretchen Magers 6–3, 6–7, 6–2
 It was McNeil's 3rd title of the year and the 14th of her career. It was Suková's 1st title of the year and the 29th of her career.

References

External links
 ITF tournament edition details
 Tournament draws

U.S. Women's Hard Court Championships
Connecticut Open (tennis)
U.S. Women's Hard Court Championships
U.S. Women's Hard Court Championships
U.S. Women's Hard Court Championships
U.S. Women's Hard Court Championships
Tennis in Texas